Heka (Mandarin: 河卡镇) is a town in Xinghai County, Hainan Tibetan Autonomous Prefecture, Qinghai, China. In 2010, Heka had a total population of 14,233 people: 7,252 males and 6,981 females: 3,903 under 14 years old, 9,621 aged between 15 and 64 and 659 over 65 years old.

References 

Township-level divisions of Qinghai
Hainan Tibetan Autonomous Prefecture